Dino Beganovic ( [ˈdino bɛˈɡanovitɕ]; born 19 January 2004) is a Swedish-Bosnian racing driver, currently competing in the 2023 FIA Formula 3 Championship with Prema Racing. He was the 2022 Formula Regional European champion. He is a member of the Ferrari Driver Academy.

Career

Karting 
Beganovic started karting in 2011. He won multiple national championships, such as the Swedish OK Junior karting category in 2018. In 2019, Beganovic won the OK category in both the Swedish and Italian championships and finished second in WSK Euro Series the same year.

Lower formulae 
In 2020 Beganovic made his single-seater debut, competing in the Italian F4 Championship with Prema Powerteam. There, he won one race at Imola and finished third in the standings, only behind Francesco Pizzi and champion Gabriele Minì. He also participated in selected rounds of the ADAC Formula 4 with the Italian team, scoring twelve points across two weekends.

Formula Regional European Championship

2021 

Beganovic made his Formula Three debut in 2021, competing in both the F3 Asian Championship and the Formula Regional European Championship with Prema. Despite only racing for three of the five rounds in the Asian series, the Swede achieved four podiums and five Rookie Cup victories, and ended up seventh in the overall standings. He then competed in his first season in the Formula Regional European Championship, where he achieved two rookie victories, one podium, and one pole position.

2022 
Beganovic remained in the Formula Regional European Championship with Prema Powerteam. Before his main campaign, he took part in the Formula Regional Asian Championship with Mumbai Falcons. He took one victory and three further second-places to end fifth overall. He then participated in his second Formula Regional campaign, taking four wins and thirteen podiums to win the championship with one race to spare.

2023 
At the start of 2023 before his main F3 campaign, Beganovic will return to the newly rebranded Formula Regional Middle East Championship with Mumbai Falcons.

FIA Formula 3 Championship 
On 20 September, Prema announced that Beganovic would be participating in a three-day FIA F3 test at Jerez, alongside Paul Aron and Zak O'Sullivan. A month later, Beganovic was confirmed to drive for the team for the 2023 FIA Formula 3 Championship, having the "FDA [do] everything to get 2023 F3 seat at Prema".

Formula One 
At the start of 2020 and his single-seater career, Beganovic was announced to be joining the Ferrari Driver Academy. During the Covid-19 lockdown period, Beganovic was called up by Ferrari to race in the Bahrain Virtual GP.

Personal life  
Beganovic was born in Linköping, Sweden. His parents, Fikret and Mirnesa emigrated to Sweden from Bosnia and Herzegovina before he was born. He has a younger brother, Emir.

In addition to his native Swedish and Bosnian languages, Beganovic also speaks English and Italian.

Karting record

Karting career summary

Racing record

Racing career summary 

* Season still in progress.

Complete Italian F4 Championship results 
(key) (Races in bold indicate pole position) (Races in italics indicate fastest lap)

Complete Formula Regional Asian Championship results 
(key) (Races in bold indicate pole position) (Races in italics indicate fastest lap)

† Driver did not finish the race, but was classified as they completed over 75% of the race distance.

Complete Formula Regional European Championship results 
(key) (Races in bold indicate pole position) (Races in italics indicate fastest lap)

Complete Formula Regional Middle East Championship results
(key) (Races in bold indicate pole position) (Races in italics indicate fastest lap)

* Season still in progress.

Complete FIA Formula 3 Championship results 
(key) (Races in bold indicate pole position) (Races in italics indicate fastest lap)

References

External links 
 
 

2004 births
Living people
Ferrari people
Italian F4 Championship drivers
Sportspeople from Linköping
Swedish racing drivers
Swedish people of Bosnia and Herzegovina descent
F3 Asian Championship drivers
Formula Regional Asian Championship drivers
Formula Regional European Championship drivers
Prema Powerteam drivers
ADAC Formula 4 drivers
Karting World Championship drivers
FIA Formula 3 Championship drivers
Mumbai Falcons drivers
Formula Regional Middle East Championship drivers